Survivor: Honduras (Hisardut Honduras) is the seventh season of the Israeli reality program Survivor. The season features 18 contestants, 9 celebrities and 9 non-celebrities, competing against each other for the 1 million NIS prize and the title of "Sole Survivor". The season was filmed in Honduras during June and July 2015. The season, the first of the show to air on Channel 2, aired twice weekly from November 1, 2015 until the live finale on March 1, 2016, where  Liron "Tiltil" Orfali was named the Sole Survivor and audience's favorite player after winning a public vote.

This season introduced the zombie twist, in which eliminated contestants remained in the game as zombies, living in a fenced-off area in their former tribe's camp. The next time their former tribe lost an immunity challenge, the zombie challenged one of their former tribe-mates to a duel. If the zombie lost the duel, the zombie exited the game as normal. If the zombie won, they voted in the duel loser's stead at the upcoming Tribal Council, and then duelled the newly voted out castaway for the right to remain the zombie. At predetermined points during the game, the remaining zombies competed against each other, with the winner returning to the game. This was the first season that the jury voted for the winner during the game, instead of months later at the live finale as in previous seasons (the result was still revealed at the live finale), and the only season to feature four finalists facing the jury's vote instead of two or three. This season also retained the Negotiation Cabin from the previous season, in which one contestant from each tribe met to negotiate deals, such as picking castaways to switch tribes or choosing items to take from the other tribes' camp.

Contestants
The cast includes nine celebrities and nine ordinary Israelis. The nine civilians include model Huda Naccache.

Season summary

Survivor Auction

Voting history

External links
 

Survivor (Israeli TV series)
Channel 2 (Israeli TV channel) original programming
2015 Israeli television seasons
2016 Israeli television seasons
Reality television articles with incorrect naming style
Television shows filmed in Honduras